Frank Harold Arnold (born October 1, 1934) is an American retired college basketball coach.  He served as the head basketball coach at Brigham Young University (BYU) from 1975 to 1983 and at the University of Hawaii at Manoa from 1985 to 1987.

Early life and college playing career
Born in Ogden, Utah, Arnold grew up in Pocatello, Idaho and graduated from Pocatello High School in 1952. He then attended Idaho State University in Pocatello and lettered on the Idaho State Bengals basketball team from 1954 to 1956.

Coaching career
After graduating from Idaho State in 1956, Arnold became an assistant basketball coach at Payette High School in Payette, Idaho in 1956. In 1958, Arnold became head coach at Brigham Young High School in Provo, Utah and enrolled in graduate school at the Brigham Young University College of Education, from which he earned a master's degree in education in 1960, then coached at BYU's laboratory school until 1962.

In 1962, Arnold enrolled in a doctoral program at the University of Oregon and became a graduate assistant on the Oregon Ducks basketball team. In 1963, Arnold returned to Pocatello High to be head coach. The following year, Arnold moved to Vancouver, Washington to be head coach at Clark Junior College, where he would stay for two seasons until 1966. Arnold then returned to the University of Oregon to be assistant coach under Steve Belko, who coached Arnold at Idaho State.

Arnold joined John Wooden's staff at UCLA in 1971 to replace Denny Crum, who left to take the head coaching position at Louisville.

Arnold was hired to replace BYU coach Glenn Potter in 1975.  Prior to coming to BYU, Arnold had been tutored by UCLA legendary coach John Wooden, working as an assistant for the “Wizard of Westwood” during the school's glory years. Arnold was Wooden's assistant coach for three NCAA championships.

Arnold led the Cougars to a 137–94 (.593) record, won three Western Athletic Conference basketball titles and also coached them to three trips to NCAA tournament and another to the NIT. BYU made it to the NCAA final 8 with a team starring future NBA players Danny Ainge, Greg Kite and Fred Roberts. Arnold struggled after the 1981 season and finished coaching at BYU in 1983.

Arnold accepted the head coaching position at the University of Hawaii in 1985 and coached at the school for two seasons and led the Rainbow Warriors to an 11–45 (.244) record. He resigned in 1987 and noted that his lack of success at the school was because "In order to win here you have to have J.C. transfers and that doesn't fit into my recruiting or coaching style". Arnold then was an assistant at Arizona State for two seasons.

Personal life
His son Gib Arnold also became a basketball coach and was most recently head coach at Hawaii from 2010 to 2014.

Head coaching record

Junior college

College

References

1934 births
Living people
Basketball coaches from Idaho
Arizona State Sun Devils men's basketball coaches
Basketball players from Idaho
Brigham Young University alumni
BYU Cougars men's basketball coaches
Hawaii Rainbow Warriors basketball coaches
High school basketball coaches in Idaho
Idaho State Bengals men's basketball players
Junior college men's basketball coaches in the United States
Oregon Ducks men's basketball coaches
Sportspeople from Ogden, Utah
Sportspeople from Pocatello, Idaho
UCLA Bruins men's basketball coaches
University of Oregon alumni
American men's basketball players
High school basketball coaches in Utah